Château d'Armailhac, previously named Château Mouton-d'Armailhacq (historical name from inception, 1750–1955), Château Mouton-Baron Philippe, Mouton Baronne and Château Mouton-Baronne-Philippe (1979–1988), is a winery in the Pauillac appellation of the Bordeaux region of France. The wine produced here was classified as one of eighteen Cinquièmes Crus (Fifth Growths) in the Bordeaux Wine Official Classification of 1855. In 1989, Baroness Philippine decided to restore its original identity to Mouton d’Armailhacq, giving it the name Château d’Armailhac.

The terroir 
The Chateau has about  planted with Cabernet Sauvignon (56%), Merlot (32%), Cabernet Franc (10%), and Petit Verdot (2%). Purchased by Baron Philippe de Rothschild in 1934, the estate is currently owned by the Mouton Rothschild branch of the Rothschild family.

Château d'Armailhac is among the first estates known to have actively grown Cabernet Sauvignon and is a likely source of Cabernet vines for other estates.

References

External links 
 Baron Philippe de Rothschild S.A. official site

Bordeaux wine producers
Rothschild family residences